The 1953 Sun Bowl was a college football postseason bowl game that featured the Pacific Tigers and the Mississippi Southern.

Background
This was the sixth bowl in seven years and second straight Sun Bowl for Pacific. Mississippi Southern came in on a ten-game winning steak after losing to Alabama in the season-opener.

Game summary
A fumble on the kickoff return to begin the second half led to another Pacific touchdown. Four fumbles were lost on the day by the Mississippi Southern. Hugh Laurin Pepper scored the only Mississippi Southern touchdown, with little time remaining. Tom McCormack rushed for three touchdowns, a then record. J. T. Shepard blocked a block and recovered a fumble along with making some tackles, in a losing effort.

Aftermath
The Tigers never returned to a bowl game before the college dissolved the football program in 1995. The Mississippi Southern returned to the Sun Bowl the following year for their second of four bowl appearances in a span five years.

References

Sun Bowl
Sun Bowl
Pacific Tigers football bowl games
Southern Miss Golden Eagles football bowl games
1953 in sports in Texas
January 1953 sports events in the United States